USS Bates (DE-68/APD-47) was a  in service with the United States Navy from 1943 to 1945. She sank after being hit by three kamikaze on 25 May 1945.

History
USS Bates was named in honour of Ensign Edward M. Bates (19 September 1919 – 7 December 1941), who was killed on board  during the attack on Pearl Harbor. Bates was launched on 6 June 1943 at the Bethlehem-Hingham Shipyard, Inc., Hingham, Massachusetts; sponsored by Mrs. Elizabeth Mason Bates, mother of Ensign Bates; and commissioned on 12 September 1943.

Battle of the Atlantic
Bates reported to the Atlantic Fleet, and escorted convoys to and from the British Isles until May 1944, primarily engaged in coastal escort and patrol duty with Escort Division 19.  At this time, CortDiv 19 consisted of the destroyer escorts 
She completed three round-trip crossings by May. On 31 May 1944 she arrived at Plymouth, England, and reported to TF 129 in preparation for the invasion of Normandy. Between 6 and 12 June, she carried out fire support duties off the Normandy coast. On 8 June, she rescued 163 survivors of the destroyer , which sustained severe damage and sank when she struck a mine.

Returning to New York City on 21 June, Bates underwent a brief yard availability and then escorted another convoy to England.  Upon her return, she was converted to a Charles Lawrence-class high speed transport by Marine Basin Shipyard, Brooklyn.  On 31 July her classification was changed to APD-47.  Her conversion was completed on 23 October, and she departed the east coast five days later for the Pacific Ocean.

Pacific War
Between December 1944 and February 1945, Bates carried out training operations, with various Underwater Demolition Teams embarked, in the vicinity of the Hawaiian and western Caroline Islands.  On 10 February, she departed Ulithi en route to the invasion of Iwo Jima.  She arrived off Iwo Jima on 16 February and remained in the vicinity until 4 March, during which time she conducted high-speed observation runs around the island and acted as the parent ship for UDT-12.

After a brief period of availability at Ulithi she departed for the invasion of Okinawa.  Between 25 March and 25 May, Bates assisted in UDT operations, conducted patrols, and escorted two convoys between Ulithi and Okinawa.  On 6 April she rescued 23 survivors of the destroyer , which had been hit by a Japanese suicide aircraft.

At 1115 on 25 May, while patrolling two miles south of Ie Shima, Okinawa, Bates was attacked by three Japanese aircraft.  The first dropped a bomb, scoring a near miss which ruptured the starboard hull of the ship, and then crashed into the starboard side of the fantail.  The second aircraft, almost simultaneously, made a suicide hit on the pilothouse.  Shortly thereafter, the third aircraft made a bombing run scoring a near miss amidships, portside, rupturing the hull.  At 1145 the commanding officer ordered Bates abandoned.  Twenty-one of her crew were either dead or missing from the attacks.  During the afternoon, the tug  was able to get a line aboard and towed Bates to Ie Shima anchorage. At 1923 on 25 May 1945, the still burning Bates capsized and sank in 20 fathoms of water.

Awards
Bates received three battle stars for her World War II service in the Atlantic and Pacific.

References 

Brown, David. Warship Losses of World War Two. Arms and Armour, London, Great Britain, 1990. .

External links

 

Buckley-class destroyer escorts
Charles Lawrence-class high speed transports
World War II frigates and destroyer escorts of the United States
World War II amphibious warfare vessels of the United States
Ships built in Hingham, Massachusetts
1943 ships
World War II shipwrecks in the Pacific Ocean
Ships sunk by kamikaze attack
Maritime incidents in May 1945